NEWS Best is the first compilation album released by the Japanese boy group NEWS.

Track List

External links
Official website 

2012 greatest hits albums
News (band) albums